Coluria longifolia is a plant species in the genus Coluria found in alpine meadows (2700–4600 m) in Gansu, Qinghai, Sichuan, Xizang and Yunnan, China.

References

Colurieae
Plants described in 1882
Flora of China